Debden Green is a hamlet in the civil parish of Debden, in the Uttlesford district of Essex, England and  west from the town of Thaxted. It is centred around a crossroads on the main Debden to Thaxted road where the road from Henham and Hamperden End intersects at a point known as Debden Cross. A byway or green lane, called Pepples Lane, connects Debden Cross with Wimbish,  to the north.

The source of the River Chelmer rises to the west of Debden Green in Rowney Wood.

Until the 1980s, Debden Green had its own post office and grocery store. There are 12 Grade II listed buildings in the hamlet.

A windmill once stood in Monks Lane. The post mill was built around 1719, possibly to replace an earlier mill, and was demolished during the First World War or immediately afterwards.

Debden Green used to have a slaughter house (now Pages Farm).  The single track road connecting Pepples Lane with Debden Cross was known locally as Slaughterhouse Lane.

References 

Hamlets in Essex
Uttlesford